The following is a timeline of the history of the city of Derby, England.

Prior to 18th century
 9thC. – Danes take town (approximate date).
 917 
 Æthelflæd, Lady of the Mercians wins sweeping conquests to oust the Danes.
 Market active.
 1160 – Derby School established (approximate date).
 1206 - First extant charter granted to Derby.
 1229
 A second charter granted by Henry III.
 Derby fair active.
 1294 – Parliamentary representation begins.
 1337 - Edward III. on the petition of the burgesses grants them two bailiffs.
 1530 – All Saints' Church tower built.
 1592 – Plague.
 1611 - Derby incorporated by James I.
 1638 – Henry Mellor becomes mayor.
 1660 – County Hall built.
 1665 – Plague.
 1675 – Derby Company of Mercers formed.
 1696 – Osmaston Hall built.

18th century
 1717 - Silk “throwing” or spinning introduced by John Lombe.
 1721 – Lombe's Mill built.
 1726 – Derby Postman newspaper begins publication.
 1731 – Town Hall built (approximate date).
 1732 – Derby Mercury newspaper begins publication.
 1735 – 9 July: Samuel Johnson marries at St Werburgh's Church.
 1745
 4 December: Jacobite army arrives.
 5 December: Jacobites meet at Exeter House and decide that Bonnie Prince Charlie, the young Pretender should return to Scotland instead of going on to London.
 1750
 Derby Porcelain Company in business.
 Markeaton Hall built (approximate date).
 Manufacture of hosiery profited by the inventions of Jedediah Strutt.
 1756 – County prison built in Nun's Green.
 1772 – New Jerusalem Chapel built.
 1773 – Theatre built.
 1774 – Assembly room built.
 1783 – Derby Philosophical Society founded.
 1796 – Derby Canal constructed.

19th century
 1802 – General Baptist Chapel built.
 1805 – King Street Wesleyan Methodist Chapel built.
 1808
 Derby Literary and Philosophical Society established.
 Friends' Meeting House built.
 1809 – Cox and Co. shot mill built.
 1810 – Infirmary built.
 1811
 Permanent Library established.
 Population: 13,043.
 1817 – Derby Choral Society established.
 1820 – Swedenborgian Chapel built.
 1823 – Derby Reporter newspaper begins publication.
 1824 – New Connexion Chapel built.
 1825 – Mechanics' Institution established.
 1828
 Town Hall rebuilt.
 St. John's Church opens.
 1832 – Town and County Library established.
 1833 – Labour strike.
 1835 – Joseph Strutt elected mayor.
 1836
 Police force and Derby Town and County Museum and Natural History Society established.
 Trinity Church consecrated.
 1837 – Mechanics' Hall opens.
 1839
 May: The founding companies of the Midland Railway begin operating.
 Derby Exhibition held.
 St Mary's Church built.
 1840
 Derby railway station, Derby Arboretum, and Christ Church open.
 Athenaeum built (approximate date).
 1841
 Derby Baptist Chapel, St Mary's Gate opens
 1842 – Arboretum Festival begins.
 1843
 General Cemetery and Vernon Street Prison in operation.
 Primitive Methodist Chapel built.
 Agricultural Show held.
 1844 – Midland Railway company formed.
 1846 – St Alkmund's Church built.
 1850 – Derby Co-operative Society established.
 1856 – John Smith clockmaker in business.
 1862 – Corn Exchange opens.
 1863 – County Cricket Ground established.
 1866 – Market hall opens.
 1870 – Derbyshire County Cricket Club formed.
 1878 – April: Great Northern Railway opens its Derbyshire extension through Friargate railway station.
 1879
 Derby Free Library and Museum opens.
 Derby Daily Telegraph and Reporter begins publication.
 1882 – Art gallery opens.
 1886 – 6 May: Grand Theatre burns down.
 1887 – Derby Sketching Club formed.
 1888 - Derby becomes a County Borough
 1891 - Population: 94,146.
 1895 – Midland Railway Institute built.
 1899 – Derby Technical College founded.

20th century

 1901 - Population: 114,848. 
 1902 – Derby Municipal Secondary School for Boys opens.
 1908 – Rolls-Royce Limited headquartered in Derby.
 1910
 Victoria Electric Theatre opens.
 Cosmopolitan Public Hall built.
 1918 – British Cellulose and Chemical Manufacturing Company plant built.
 1930 – Bemrose School opens.
 1971 – BBC Radio Derby begins broadcasting.
 1974 – Derby Industrial Museum opens.
 1975
 Derby Playhouse opens.
 Eagle Centre shopping centre in business.
 1981 - Social unrest.
 1988 – Pickford's House Museum of Georgian Life and Costume established.
 1992
 University of Derby established.
 Derby Heritage Centre in business.
 1995 – Derby Grammar School founded.
 1997 – Pride Park Stadium opens.
 1998 – Bronze Age Hanson Log Boat discovered near town.

21st century

 2007 – Saint Alkmund's Way Footbridge opens.
 2009 – Cathedral Green Footbridge opens.
 2011 – Population: 248,700.
 2012
 11 May: Allenton house fire.

See also

 History of Derby
 Timelines of other cities in East Midlands: Leicester, Lincoln, Nottingham

References

Bibliography

Published in the 19th century

1800s-1840s

1850s-1890s

Published in the 20th century

External links

 . Includes Derby area directories, various dates.

 
derby
derby
Derby